In the context of United States law, originalism is a theory of constitutional interpretation that asserts that all statements in the Constitution must be interpreted based on the original understanding "at the time it was adopted". This concept views the Constitution as stable from the time of enactment and that the meaning of its contents can be changed only by the steps set out in Article Five. This notion stands in contrast to the concept of the Living Constitution, which asserts that the Constitution should be interpreted based on the context of current times, even if such interpretation is different from the original interpretations of the document. Originalism should not be confused with strict constructionism.

The idea that judicial review was distinguished from ordinary political process by the application of principles grew to be understood as fundamental to the legitimacy of judicial interpretation. Proponents of originalism argue that originalism was the primary method of legal interpretation in America from the time of its founding until the time of the New Deal, when competing theories of interpretation grew in prominence. Critics of originalism argue that its appeal in modern times is rooted in conservative political resistance to the Brown v. Board of Education Supreme Court decision and opposition to some civil rights legislation.

"Originalism" can refer to original intent or original meaning. The divisions between the theories relate to what exactly that identifiable original intent or original meaning is: the intentions of the authors or the ratifiers, the original meaning of the text, a combination of the two, or the original meaning of the text but not its expected application.

Forms

Originalism is an umbrella term for interpretative methods that hold to the "fixation thesis", the notion that an utterance's semantic content is fixed at the time it is uttered. Two alternative understandings about the sources of meaning have been proposed:
 The original intent theory, which holds that interpretation of a written constitution is (or should be) consistent with what those who drafted and ratified it intended the meaning to be. This view has become largely depreciated among 21st century originalists. Alfred Avins and Raoul Berger (author of Government by Judiciary) were proponents of this view.
 The original meaning theory, which is closely related to textualism, is the view that interpretation of a written constitution or law should be based on what reasonable persons living at the time of its adoption would have understood the ordinary meaning of the text to be. Antonin Scalia was a proponent of this view, as are Clarence Thomas and Amy Coney Barrett.

As a school of legal thought, originalism can be traced to Robert Bork's "Neutral Principles and Some First Amendment Problems", published in the Indiana Law Journal in January 1971. However, it was not until the 1980s, when conservative jurists began to take seats on the Supreme Court, that the debate really began in earnest. "Old originalism" focused primarily on "intent", mostly by default. But that line was largely abandoned in the early 1990s; as "new originalism" emerged, most adherents subscribed to "original meaning" originalism, though there are some intentionalists within new originalism.

Original intent

The original form of originalism is sometimes called intentionalism, or original intent originalism, and looked for the subjective intent of a law's enactors. One problem with this approach is identifying the relevant "lawmaker" whose intent is sought. For instance, the authors of the U.S. Constitution could be the particular Founding Fathers that drafted it, such as those on the Committee of Detail. Or, since the Constitution purports to originate from the People, one could look to the various state ratifying conventions. The intentionalist methodology involves studying the writings of its authors, or the records of the Philadelphia Convention, or debates in the state legislatures, for clues as to their intent.

There are two kinds of intent analysis, reflecting two meanings of the word intent. The first, a rule of common law construction during the Founding Era, is functional intent. The second is motivational intent. To understand the difference, one can use the metaphor of an architect who designs a Gothic church with flying buttresses. The functional intent of flying buttresses is to prevent the weight of the roof from spreading the walls and causing a collapse of the building, which can be inferred from examining the design as a whole. The motivational intent might be to create work for his brother-in-law who is a flying buttress subcontractor. Using original intent analysis of the first kind, one might decide that the language of Article III of the U.S. Constitution was to delegate to Congress the power to allocate original and appellate jurisdictions, and not to remove some jurisdiction, involving a constitutional question, from all courts. That would suggest that the decision was wrong in Ex Parte McCardle.

According to a 2021 paper in the Columbia Law Review, the Founding Fathers did not include a nondelegation doctrine in the Constitution, contrary to the claims of some originalists. According to the paper, "the Founders saw nothing wrong with delegations as a matter of legal theory."

Problems with intentionalism
However, intentionalism encounters numerous problems when applied to the Constitution.  For example, most of the Founders did not leave detailed discussions of what their intent was in 1787, and, while a few did, there is no reason to think that their views should be dispositive of what the rest thought.  Moreover, the discussions of the drafters may have been recorded; however they were not available to the ratifiers in each state.  The theory of original intent was challenged in a string of law review articles in the 1980s. Specifically, original intent was seen as lacking good answers to three important questions: whether a diverse group such as the framers even had a single intent; if they did, whether it could be determined from two centuries' distance; and, whether the framers themselves would have supported original intent.

In response to this, a different strain of originalism, articulated by (among others) Antonin Scalia, Robert Bork, and Randy Barnett, came to the fore. This is dubbed original meaning.

Original meaning

Justice Oliver Wendell Holmes argued that interpreting what was meant by someone who wrote a law was not trying to "get into his mind" because the issue was "not what this man meant, but what those words would mean in the mouth of a normal speaker of English, using them in the circumstances in which they were used." This is the essential precept of modern originalism.

The most robust and widely cited form of originalism, original meaning, emphasizes how the text would have been understood by a reasonable person in the historical period during which the constitution was proposed, ratified, and first implemented. For example, economist Thomas Sowell notes that phrases like "due process" and "freedom of the press" had a long established meaning in English law, even before they were put into the Constitution of the United States. Applying this form involves studying dictionaries and other writings of the time (for example, Blackstone's Commentaries on the Laws of England; see "Matters rendered moot by originalism", infra) to establish what particular terms meant. (See Methodology, infra).

Justice Scalia, one of the most forceful modern advocates for originalism, defined himself as belonging to the latter category:

Though there is evidence that the Founding Fathers intended the Constitution to be like a statute, this fact does not matter under Scalia's approach. Adherence to original meaning is explicitly divorced from the intent of the Founders; rather, the reasons for adhering to original meaning derive from other justifications, such as the argument that the understanding of the ratifiers (the people of the several States at the time of the adoption of the Constitution) should be controlling, as well as consequentialist arguments about original meaning's positive effect on rule of law.

Perhaps the clearest example illustrating the importance of the difference between original intent and original meaning is the Twenty-seventh Amendment. The Twenty-seventh Amendment was proposed as part of the Bill of Rights in 1791, but failed to be ratified by the required number of states for two centuries, eventually being ratified in 1992. An original intent inquiry might ask what the framers understood the amendment to mean when it was written, though some would argue that it was the intent of the latter-day ratifiers that is important. An original-meaning inquiry would ask what the plain, public meaning of the text was in 1992 when it was eventually ratified.

Semantic originalism
Semantic-originalism is Ronald Dworkin's term for the theory that the original meaning of many statutes implies that those statutes prohibit certain acts widely considered not to be prohibited by the statutes at the time of their passages.  This type of originalism contrasts with expectations originalism, which adheres to how the statutes functioned at the times of their passages, without any expectation that they would function in any other particular ways.

Justice Antonin Scalia and other originalists often claim that the death penalty is not "cruel and unusual punishment" because at the time of the Eighth Amendment's passage, it was a punishment believed to be neither cruel nor unusual. Dworkin and the semantic-originalists assert, however, that if advances in moral philosophy (presuming that such advances are possible) reveal that the death penalty is in fact "cruel and unusual", then the original meaning of the Eighth Amendment implies that the death penalty is unconstitutional. All the same, Justice Scalia purported to follow semantic originalism, although he conceded that Dworkin does not believe Scalia was true to that calling.

Framework originalism

Framework Originalism is an approach developed by Jack Balkin, a professor of law at Yale Law School. Framework Originalism, or Living Originalism, is a blend of two principal constitutional interpretive methods: originalism and Living Constitution. Balkin holds that there is no inherent contradiction between these two interpretive approaches—when properly understood. Framework Originalists view the Constitution as an "initial framework for governance that sets politics in motion." This "framework" must be built-out or filled-out over time, successive generations, by the various legislative and judicial branches. This process is achieved, primarily, through building political institutions, passing legislation, and creating precedents (both judicial and non-judicial). In effect, the process of building out the Constitution on top of the framework of the original meaning is living constitutionalism, the change of and progress of law over time to address particular (current) issues. The authority of the judiciary and of the political branches to engage in constitutional construction comes from their "joint responsiveness to public opinion" over long stretches of time, while operating within the basic framework of the original meaning. Balkin claims that through mechanisms of social influence, both judges and the political branches inevitably come to reflect and respond to changing social mores, norms, customs and (public) opinions.

According to Framework originalism, interpreters should adhere to the original meaning of the Constitution, but are not necessarily required to follow the original expected application (although they may use it to create doctrines and decide cases). For example, states should extend the equal protection of the laws to all peoples, in cases where it would not originally or normally have applied. Contemporary interpreters are not bound by how people in 1868 would have applied these words and meanings to issues such as racial segregation or (sexual) discrimination, largely due to the fact the Fourteenth Amendment is concerned with such issues (as well as the fact that the Fourteenth Amendment was not proposed or ratified by the founders). When the Constitution uses or applies principles or standards, like "equal protection" or "unreasonable searches and seizures," further construction is usually required, by either the judiciary, the executive, or the legislative branch. Therefore, Balkin claims, (pure, unadulterated) originalism is not sufficient to decide a wide range of cases or controversies. Judges, he posits, will have to "engage in considerable constitutional construction as well as the elaboration and application of previous constructions." For example, originalism (in and of itself), is not sufficient to constrain judicial behavior. Constraint itself does not just come from doctrine or canons, but also from institutional, political, and cultural sources. These constraints include: multi-member or panel courts (where the balance of power lies with moderate judges); the screening of judges through the federal judicial appointment process; social and cultural influences on the judiciary (which keep judges attuned and attentive to popular opinions and the political will of the people); and prevailing professional legal culture and professional conceptions of the role of the judiciary (which produce social norms or mores). These constraints ensure that judges act as impartial arbiters of the law and to try to behave in a principled manner, as it applies to decision making.

Professor Nelson Lund of George Mason University Law School has criticized Balkin's living originalism theory. Specifically, Lund argues that living originalism could be used to read the 26th Amendment to the United States Constitution in such a way that it allows for an 18-year-old U.S. President (with the argument being that the 26th Amendment implicitly amends the 35-year age requirement for the U.S. Presidency as well as all other age requirements for federal offices to make all of them 18 years). Also, Lund argues that if living originalism could be used to justify a constitutional right to same-sex marriage, then "it would be child's play to construct the Fourteenth Amendment into a shield for polygamy, prostitution, incest (at least among adults), polyamorous marriages, and a variety of other unorthodox sexual relationships." Finally, Lund argues that "[w]hatever one's reasons for accepting Balkin's proposal to marry originalism and living constitutionalism, doing so leaves originalism itself in a condition akin to the legal death that married women experienced under the old rules of coverture."

Related positions

Strict constructionism

According to University of Toledo law professor Lee J. Strang, a conservative advocate for originalism, early versions of originalism ("not the sophisticated, more-fully explicated originalism of today") were used at the Founding up until the 1930s; Strang notes that his claims are "contested in the literature" though.

Bret Boyce described the origins of the term originalist as follows: The term "originalism" has been most commonly used since the middle 1980s, and was apparently coined by Paul Brest in The Misconceived Quest for the Original Understanding. It is often asserted that originalism is synonymous with strict constructionism.

Both theories are associated with textualist and formalist schools of thought; however, there are pronounced differences between them.  Scalia differentiated the two by pointing out that, unlike an originalist, a strict constructionist would not acknowledge that he uses a cane means he walks with a cane (because, strictly speaking, this is not what he uses a cane means). Scalia averred that he was "not a strict constructionist, and no-one ought to be"; he goes further, calling strict constructionism "a degraded form of textualism that brings the whole philosophy into disrepute".

Legal scholar Randy Barnett asserts that originalism is a theory of interpretation, not construction. However, this distinction between "interpretation" and "construction" is controversial and is rejected by many nonoriginalists as artificial. As Scalia said, "the Constitution, or any text, should be interpreted [n]either strictly [n]or sloppily; it should be interpreted reasonably"; once originalism has told a Judge what the provision of the Constitution means, they are bound by that meaning—however the business of Judging is not simply to know what the text means (interpretation), but to take the law's necessarily general provisions and apply them to the specifics of a given case or controversy (construction). In many cases, the meaning might be so specific that no discretion is permissible, but in many cases, it is still before the Judge to say what a reasonable interpretation might be. A judge could, therefore, be both an originalist and a strict constructionist—but she is not one by virtue of being the other.

Declarationism

Declarationism is a legal philosophy that incorporates the United States Declaration of Independence into the body of case law on level with the United States Constitution. It holds that the Declaration is a natural law document and so that natural law has a place within American jurisprudence. Its main proponents include Harry V. Jaffa and other members of the Claremont Institute. Some proponents claim that Supreme Court Justice Clarence Thomas is a follower of this school of thought; however, Thomas is more widely considered a member of the strict constructionist school.

In Cotting v. Godard, 183 U.S. 79 (1901), the United States Supreme Court stated:
The first official action of this nation declared the foundation of government in these words: "We hold these truths to be self evident, that all men are created equal, that they are endowed by their Creator with certain unalienable rights, that among these are life, liberty, and the pursuit of happiness." While such declaration of principles may not have the force of organic law, or be made the basis of judicial decision as to the limits of right and duty, and while in all cases reference must be had to the organic law of the nation for such limits, yet the latter is but the body and the letter of which the former is the thought and the spirit, and it is always safe to read the letter of the Constitution in the spirit of the Declaration of Independence. No duty rests more imperatively upon the courts than the enforcement of those constitutional provisions intended to secure that equality of rights which is the foundation of free government."
Proponents claim that the concept is derived from the philosophical structure contained in the Declaration of Independence and assertion that it was the Declaration that revealed the United States as a new emergent nation, the Constitution creating only the federal government. According to this view, the authority to create the Constitution derives from the prior act of nation-creation accomplished by the Declaration. The Declaration declares that the people have a right to alter or abolish any government once it becomes destructive of their natural rights. The turn away from the Articles of Confederation with the ratification of the Constitution was an action of this sort and so the Constitution's authority exists within the legal framework established by the Declaration. The Constitution cannot, then, be interpreted as though it were the foundation of constitutional law, in the absence of principles derived from the Declaration.

Though philosophically conservative, Declarationists such as Jaffa have been outspoken critics of originalist jurists including Robert Bork, Antonin Scalia, and William Rehnquist, likening them to legal positivists. Bork and legal scholar Lino Graglia have, in turn, critiqued the Declarationist position, retorting that it is single-mindedly obsessive over the Dred Scott decision and resembles a theology rather than a legal doctrine.

Methodology
In "The Original Meaning of the Recess Appointments Clause", Michael B. Rappaport described the methodology associated with the "original meaning" form of originalism as follows:

"The task is to determine the original meaning of the language ... that is, to understand how knowledgeable individuals would have understood this language ... when it was drafted and ratified. Interpreters at the time would have examined various factors, including text, purpose, structure, and history."
"The most important factor is the text of the Clause. The modern interpreter should read the language in accord with the meaning it would have had in the late 1780s. Permissible meanings from that time include the ordinary meanings as well as more technical legal meanings words may have had."
"If the language has more than one interpretation, then one would look to purpose, structure, and history to help to clarify the ambiguity. Purpose, structure, and history provide evidence for determining which meaning of the language the authors would have intended."
"The purpose of a Clause involves the objectives or goals that the authors would have sought to accomplish in enacting it. One common and permissible way to discern the purpose is to look to the evident or obvious purpose of a provision. Yet, purpose arguments can be dangerous, because it is easy for interpreters to focus on one purpose to the exclusion of other possible purposes without any strong arguments for doing so."
"Historical evidence can reveal the values that were widely held by the Framers' generation and that presumably informed their purposes when enacting constitutional provisions. History can also reveal their practices, which when widely accepted would be evidence of their values."
"The structure of the document can also help to determine the purposes of the Framers. The decision to enact one constitutional clause may reveal the values of the Framers and thereby help us understand the purposes underlying a second constitutional clause."
"One additional source of evidence about the meaning of constitutional language is early constitutional interpretations by government officials or prominent commentators. ... Such interpretations may provide evidence of the original meaning of the provisions, because early interpreters would have had better knowledge of contemporary word meanings, societal values, and interpretive techniques. Of course, early interpreters may also have had political and other incentives to misconstrue the document that should be considered." (Id. at 5–7).

Discussion

Philosophical underpinnings
Originalism, in all its various forms, is predicated on a specific view of what the Constitution is, a view articulated by Chief Justice John Marshall in Marbury v. Madison:

Originalism assumes that Marbury is correct: the Constitution is the operating charter granted to government by the people, as per the preamble to the United States Constitution, and its written nature introduces a certain discipline into its interpretation. Originalism further assumes that the need for such a written charter was derived from the perception, on the part of the Framers, of the abuses of power under the (unwritten) British Constitution, under which the Constitution was essentially whatever Parliament decided it should be. In writing out a Constitution which explicitly granted the government certain authorities, and withheld from it others, and in which power was balanced between multiple agencies (the Presidency, two chambers of Congress and the Supreme Court at the national level, and State governments of the United States with similar branches), the intention of the Framers was to restrain government, originalists argue, and the value of such a document is nullified if that document's meaning is not fixed. As one author stated, "If the constitution can mean anything, then the constitution is reduced to meaninglessness."

Function of constitutional jurisprudence
Dissenting in Romer v. Evans, Scalia wrote:

This statement summarizes the role for the court envisioned by originalists, that is, that the Court parses what the general law and constitution say of a particular case or controversy, and when questions arise as to the meaning of a given constitutional provision, that provision should be given the meaning it was understood to mean when ratified. Reviewing Steven D Smith's book Law's Quandary, Scalia applied this formulation to some controversial topics routinely brought before the Court:

In Marbury, Chief Justice John Marshall established that the Supreme Court could invalidate laws which violated the Constitution (that is, judicial review), which helped establish the Supreme Court as having its own distinct sphere of influence within the federal government. However, this power was itself balanced with the requirement that the Court could only invalidate legislation if it was unconstitutional. Originalists argue that the modern court no longer follows this requirement. They argue that, since  U.S. v. Darby, the Court has increasingly taken to making rulings in which the Court has determined not what the Constitution says, but rather, the Court has sought to determine what is "morally correct" at this point in the nation's history, in terms of "the evolving standards of decency" (and considering "the context of international jurisprudence"), and then justified that determination through a "creative reading" of the text. This latter approach is frequently termed "the Living constitution"; Scalia inveighed that "the worst thing about the living constitution is that it will destroy the constitution".

Matters rendered moot by originalism
Originalists are sharply critical of the use of the evolving standards of decency (a term which first appeared in Trop v. Dulles) and of reference to the opinions of courts in foreign countries (excepting treaties to which the United States is a signatory, per Article II, Section 2, Clause 2 of the United States Constitution) in Constitutional interpretation.

In an originalist interpretation, if the meaning of the Constitution is static, then any ex post facto information (such as the opinions of the American people, American judges, or the judiciaries of any foreign country) is inherently valueless for interpreting the meaning of the Constitution, and should not form any part of constitutional jurisprudence. The Constitution is thus fixed and has procedures defining how it can be changed.

The exception to the use of foreign law is the English common law, which originalists regard as setting the philosophical stage for the US Constitution and the American common and civil law. Hence, an originalist might cite Blackstone's Commentaries to establish the meaning of the term due process as it would have been understood at the time of ratification.

See also
Constitution in Exile
Government by Judiciary, a book by Raoul Berger
Judicial activism
Legal positivism
Living Constitution
Textualism
Unconstitutional constitutional amendment

Citations

General and cited references 

 Originalism: The Quarter-Century of Debate (2007) .
 Jack N. Rakove. Original Meanings: Politics and Ideas in the Making of the Constitution (1997) .
 Keith E. Whittington, Constitutional Interpretation: Textual Meaning, Original Intent, and Judicial Review (2001) .
 Vasan Kesavan & Michael Stokes Paulsen. "The Interpretive Force of the Constitution's Secret Drafting History," 91 Geo. L.J. 1113 (2003).
 Randy E. Barnett. Restoring the Lost Constitution (2005) .
 Gary Lawson. "On Reading Recipes ... and Constitutions," 85 Geo. L.J. 1823 (1996–1997) .

Further reading

External links

 The Originalism Blog, Center for the Study of Constitutional Originalism at the University of San Diego School of Law
 Why Originalism Is So Popular, by Eric A. Posner, The New Republic
 Justice Scalia lecture at CUA, discussing originalism (1996)
 Justice Scalia lecture at Woodrow Wilson Center, comparing and contrasting originalism from the "living constitution" approach (2005)
 Legal Theory Lexicon entry on Originalism
 An Originalism for Nonoriginalists, by Randy Barnett
 "Original Intent and The Free Exercise of Religion" Joseph A. Zavaletta, Jr., Esq
 "Constitutional Issues of Taxation" Original Intent.org
 Trumping Precedent with Original Meaning: Not as Radical as It Sounds, by Randy Barnett
 The Founders Constitution Founding-era materials
 American Patriot Party Founding-era Principles
 "Judicial Activism Reconsidered", by Thomas Sowell
 Jack Balkin, Bad originalism
 Jack Balkin, "Scalia Blowing Smoke Again"
 Ed Brayton, Balkin on "Bad Originalism"  
 "Original Intent or How Does the Constitution Mean?" The London Review of Books, Vol 10, No 7, March, 1988.

Supreme Court of the United States
Conservatism in the United States
United States constitutional law
Intention
Theories of constitutional interpretation